Nebria boschi is a metal coloured species of ground beetle in the Nebriinae subfamily that is endemic to Germany.

References

boschi
Beetles described in 1949
Beetles of Europe
Endemic fauna of Germany